= Nuno Miguel Fonseca Ferreira =

President of the Coimbra Institute of Engineering
- In office 2010–present
- Preceded by: Jorge Bernardino

Personal details
- Born: 1972; Coimbra, Portugal
- Children: Camila Ferreira
- Profession: Electrical and Computer Engineering
- Website: website at ISEC

Nuno Miguel Fonseca Ferreira (born 1972) is the current president of ISEC "Coimbra Institute of Engineering". Nuno Ferreira formally took office April 13, 2010, succeeding Jorge Bernardino. Ferreira's official inauguration celebrations took place at the principal auditorium at 16:30. He was received with high expectations being a former alumni of ISEC.

== Education ==
Ferreira received his bachelor's degree in "Engenharia Electrotécnica" English equivalent of Electrical and Computer Engineering from the "Coimbra Institute of Engineering" in 1996. In 1998 his Masters of Engineering in Electrical and Computer Engineering at the "Faculdade de Engenharia do Porto". He concluded is PhD in Electrical and Computer Engineering at "Universidade de Trás-os-Montes e Alto Douro" (UTAD) in 2006.

== Career ==
He is a professor at the Electrical and Computer Engineering department at ISEC since 1997.

Ferreira has served as vice-president from 2003 to 2005, the polytechnic's second highest officer.
